The Watson Indy Roadster was an open-wheel race car chassis designed and developed by automotive mechanic and engineer A. J. Watson for U.S.A.C. Indy car racing, between 1956 and 1964.

References

Indianapolis 500
American Championship racing cars
Open wheel racing cars